Otmar Kaufhold (28 June 1952 – 3 February 2001) was a German rower. He competed in the men's eight event at the 1976 Summer Olympics.

References

1952 births
2001 deaths
German male rowers
Olympic rowers of West Germany
Rowers at the 1976 Summer Olympics
Sportspeople from Bremen